A Buddhist texts library is a large building in Chinese Buddhist temples which is built specially for storing The Chinese Buddhist Canon. It is encountered throughout East Asia, including in some Japanese Buddhist Kyōzōs.  The Chinese Buddhist Canon is the total body of Buddhist literature deemed canonical and was called "all the sutras" in the ancient time. With four thousand kinds, it includes Āgama, Vinaya and Abhidharma texts. Āgama are theories made by Buddha for disciples to practice, Vinaya are the rules formulated by Buddha for believers and Abhidharma are the collection of theories explanations by Buddha's disciples.

A Buddhist texts library is generally two-storey buildings built at the highest point of the temple. The upper storey is for storing sutras and the lower layer is the "Thousand Buddha Pavilion".

References

Further reading

External links

Chinese Buddhist architecture
Japanese Buddhist architecture
Mahayana